The 1980–81 Yugoslav Second League season was the 35th season of the Second Federal League, the second level association football competition of SFR Yugoslavia, since its establishment in 1946. The league was contested in two regional groups (West Division and East Division), with 16 clubs each.

West Division

Teams
A total of sixteen teams contested the league, including ten sides from the 1979–80 season, two clubs relegated from the 1979–80 Yugoslav First League and four sides promoted from the Inter-Republic Leagues played in the 1979–80 season. The league was contested in a double round robin format, with each club playing every other club twice, for a total of 30 rounds. Two points were awarded for wins and one point for draws.

Čelik and Osijek were relegated from the 1978–79 Yugoslav First League after finishing at the bottom two places of the league table. The four clubs promoted to the second level were AIK Bačka Topola, GOŠK Jug, Jedinstvo Brčko and Svoboda.

At the end of season the bribery scandal involving Maribor emerged, and caused the club to be relegated from second tier to third by the decision of the Football Association of Yugoslavia disciplinary committee. The club had a secret fund that was used for bribing officials and opponents. Some club officials were keeping track of the bribery expenses in their black book, which was later confiscated by the authorities. As a result of the decision, 13th placed Jedinstvo Bihać was allowed to stay in the league.

Šmartno, the winner of Slovenian league in the third tier, withdrew from promotion as a result of financial difficulties and corruption allegations that resulted in Maribor's expulsion. The clubs from second to fourth place also did the same which led to 14th placed GOŠK Jug remain at the second level.

League table

East Division

Teams
A total of sixteen teams contested the league, including twelve sides from the 1978–79 season and four sides promoted from the Inter-Republic Leagues played in the 1979–80 season. The league was contested in a double round robin format, with each club playing every other club twice, for a total of 30 rounds. Two points were awarded for wins and one point for draws.

There were no teams relegated from the 1979–80 Yugoslav First League and the four clubs promoted to the second level were Lovćen, Rabotnički, Sloboda Titovo Užice and Vlaznimi Đakovica.

Due to disturbances in the territory of Socialist Autonomous Province of Kosovo, in the second part of the season Prishtina, Trepča and Vlaznimi Đakovica played their matches outside of the region. This resulted in a great number of postponed games at the end of the season. In the final round, Galenika Zemun played away against Teteks in a match that would have brought them promotion in case of victory due to better goal difference. The game ended as a goalless draw and Teteks won the promotion.

League table

See also
1980–81 Yugoslav First League
1980–81 Yugoslav Cup

References
General

Yugoslav Second League seasons
Yugo
2